"5 Years Time", also known as "5 Years Time (Sun Sun Sun)", is the debut single by English folk rock band Noah and the Whale. It was originally released in 2007, but was later re-released on 4 August 2008 and became their first top-ten hit.

Chart performance
"5 Years Time" did not chart upon its first release in 2007. After poor initial sales, the group chose to re-release the single, and the record made it onto the charts in a number of countries. In the UK, it debuted at number 24, and went on to become Noah and the Whale's first top-ten single, peaking at number 7. In Ireland, "5 Years Time" debuted at number 47 and peaked at number 10.

Music video
The music video features the band performing in a pub and dancing/playing in the park. During the video, Laura Marling, who provides backing vocals for the group, is seen playing a tin whistle and also giving the camera the two-fingers. The video was directed by James Copeman. The style of the video resembles a Wes Anderson film, using the same font the director uses in his films/music videos.

The music video was uploaded to YouTube on 13 June 2008, and  it has been viewed over 12 million times.

Charts

Weekly charts

Year-end charts

Certifications

In popular culture
The song was used in a 2008 SunChips commercial and in a 2008 Saturn commercial and also featured in a Volkswagen Golf commercial in 2015.

References

2007 songs
2007 debut singles
2008 singles
Mercury Records singles
Noah and the Whale songs